The Motion Picture Herald was an American film industry trade paper published from 1931 to December 1972.  It was replaced by the QP Herald, which only lasted until May 1973. It was established as the Exhibitors Herald in 1915.

History

The paper's origins begin 1915 when a Chicago printing company launched a film publication as a regional trade paper for exhibitors in the Midwest and known as Exhibitors Herald.

Publisher Martin Quigley bought the paper and over the following two decades developed the Exhibitors Herald into a national trade paper for the US film industry.

In 1917, Quigley acquired and merged another publication, Motography, into his magazine. In 1927, he further acquired and merged the magazine The Moving Picture World and began publishing it as Exhibitors Herald and Moving Picture World, which was later shortened to the more manageable title, Exhibitors Herald World. Exhibitors Herald and Moving Picture World also incorporated The Film Index that was founded in 1906.

After acquiring Motion Picture News in 1930, he merged these publications into the Motion Picture Herald.

The Media History Digital Library has scans of the archive of Exhibitors Herald (1917 to 1927); Exhibitors Herald and Moving Picture World (1928); Exhibitors Herald World (1929 to 1930) and Motion Picture Herald (1931–1956) available online.

See also
 Motion Picture Daily
 International Television & Video Almanac
 Variety
 The Hollywood Reporter
 List of film periodicals

References

External links

 Exhibitors Herald and MOTOGRAPHY at Media History Digital Library
 Motion Picture Herald (1931 to 1956) at Media History Digital Library

Film magazines published in the United States
Weekly magazines published in the United States
Defunct magazines published in the United States
Magazines established in 1915
Magazines disestablished in 1972
Magazines published in Chicago
Entertainment trade magazines